Bilokurakyne is an urban-type settlement in Svatove Raion in the Luhansk Oblast of Ukraine. Prior to 2020, it was the administrative center of the former Bilokurakyne Raion. It is located on the Bila River, a right tributary of the Aidar, in the basin of the Don. Population:

Economy

Transportation
Bilokurakyne is connected by road with Starobilsk where it has further access to Highway H26 ro Svatove and Bilovodsk, as well as to Highway H21 to Luhansk. However, the section between Shchastia and Luhansk is controlled by the Luhansk People's Republic, and free movement from Shchastia to Luhansk is impossible.

There is a railway line in Bilokurakyne, which is currently disconnected from the rest of the railway network in Ukraine. To the south, it extends to Starobilsk and Kondrashivska Nova, in Stanytsia Luhanska, and to the north it crosses the border to Russia, and further runs to Valuyki. Bilokurakyne railway station has infrequent passenger traffic between Kondrashivska Nova and Lantrativka.

References

Urban-type settlements in Svatove Raion
Svatove Raion
Starobelsky Uyezd